The Catillariaceae are a family of crustose lichens in the order Lecanorales. Species of this family have a widespread distribution, especially in temperate areas. The family was originally circumscribed by Austrian lichenologist Josef Hafellner in 1984.

Genera
Catillariaceae contains 5 genera and about 44 species.
Austrolecia Hertel (1984) – 1 species 
Catillaria A.Massal. (1852) – about 30 species
Placolecis Trevis. (1857) – 4 species
Solenopsora A.Massal. (1855) – 11 species
Xanthopsorella Kalb & Hafellner (1984) – 1 species

References

Lecanoromycetes families
Lecanorales
Lichen families
Taxa named by Josef Hafellner